Dennis B. Wilson (25 June 1921 – 28 June 2022) was a British poet known mainly for his writings as a soldier in World War II.

Biography
Poems he wrote during the 1944 Normandy landings were published for the first time in 2012 by Kultura Press with the assistance of Tim Crook, a researcher at Goldsmiths College who was working on a biography of Wilson's father, the writer and spy Alexander Wilson. His mother was Alexander Wilson's first wife, Gladys.

He had two siblings, and has four half-siblings through his polygamous father's further three marriages.

In 2018, he was depicted by the actor Patrick Kennedy in the BBC drama about Alexander Wilson, Mrs Wilson. Also appearing in the series was his real-life niece, actress Ruth Wilson, portraying her grandmother.

Wilson turned 100 in June 2021, and died on 28 June 2022, at the age of 101.

Publications

References

External links
 

1921 births
2022 deaths
British male poets
British poets
British Army personnel of World War II
British Army officers
British centenarians
Men centenarians